Gianmario Ortenzi (born 23 June 1976) is an Italian former racing cyclist. Professional from 1998 to 2002, his biggest result was winning the bronze medal in the under-23 time trial at the 1998 UCI Road World Championships. He also rode in the 2001 Vuelta a España and the 2002 Giro d'Italia.

Major results

1997
 1st  Time trial, National Under-23 Road Championships
 2nd GP Palio del Recioto
 3rd Overall Giro delle Regioni
1st Stage 3
1998
 1st Overall Giro delle Regioni
 3rd  Time trial, UCI Under-23 Road World Championships
1999
 2nd Overall Settimana Internazionale Coppi e Bartali
 2nd Firenze–Pistoia
 2nd Criterium d'Abruzzo
 3rd GP d'Europe
 6th Giro di Romagna
 7th Gran Premio Bruno Beghelli
 8th Trofeo Melinda
2001
 1st  Mountains classification, Three Days of De Panne
 9th Overall Giro della Provincia di Lucca

References

External links

1976 births
Living people
Italian male cyclists
People from Recanati
Italian male triathletes
Sportspeople from the Province of Macerata
Cyclists from Marche